Wyoming is a suburb of the Central Coast region of New South Wales, Australia, located  northeast of Gosford's central business district. It is part of the  local government area.

The Aboriginal inhabitants of the Wyoming area before European settlement were the Kuringgai people.

In 1824 Frederick Augustus Hely (1794–1836) purchased  of land adjacent to Narara Reserve. Hely named the land after the Wyoming Valley of Pennsylvania, made famous by the 1809 poem Gertrude of Wyoming by Thomas Campbell.

Hely was the Principal Superintendent of Convicts. He was born in Ireland and died in Sydney. He died before the house he was planning to build at Wyoming was completed. His mausoleum lies beside the Pacific Highway at Wyoming, close to the family home which was built by his widow. The grave was designed by architect John Verge and was recently restored after falling into disrepair.

Wyoming is a predominantly residential suburb. The first building was the local pub which was built by convicts in 1854 and still exists today.  Wyoming also has medical centres, three primary schools, the Wyoming Shopping Village, and a number of fast-food outlets, petrol stations and other shops. Wyoming is home to the football (soccer) club Wyoming Tigers, affiliated with Central Coast Football.

Many residential streets in the suburb are bordered by temperate-subtropical rainforest, with interesting bushwalking opportunities.

Population
According to the 2016 census, there were 10,134 people in Wyoming.
 Aboriginal and Torres Strait Islander people made up 3.5% of the population. 
 75.3% of people were born in Australia. The most common countries of birth were England 4.9%, New Zealand 2.3% and Philippines 1.0%.   
 85.1% of people only spoke English at home. 
 The most common responses for religion were No Religion 28.7%, Catholic 20.7% and Anglican 19.1%.

Wyoming Shopping Village
Wyoming Shopping Village is a neighbourhood shopping complex in the suburb, catering for the needs of the residents, and houses a Coles supermarket. The complex was rebuilt in 2004, with all stores except Coles being demolished and replaced.

Wyoming Community Centre
Wyoming Community Centre is the Local Community Neighbourhood Centre. It is at 147 Maidens Brush Road and provides a wide range of services, activities and referrals for the local community. It is a not for profit organization.

Heritage listings
Wyoming has a number of heritage-listed sites, including:
 Pacific Highway: Hely's Grave
 Pacific Highway: Wyoming Cottage
 Renwick Street: The Grange

References

External links
 History of Wyoming (Gosford City Library)
  Wyoming Community Centre

 
Suburbs of the Central Coast (New South Wales)